John Lovel (died 1310), Lord of Minster Lovel and Titchmarsh, was an English noble.

John was the eldest son of John Lovel and Maud Sydenham. He was active in the wars in Gascony and Scotland. John received a licence to crenellate his manor of Titchmarsh in 1304. He died in 1310.

Marriage and issue
He married firstly Isabel, daughter of Arnold de Bois and Amicia, they had the following known issue:
Maud Lovel, married  William la Zouche, had issue.
After the death of his first wife, he married Joan, daughter of Robert de Ros of Helmsley and Isabel D'Aubenfy, they had the following known issue:
Joan Lovel
John Lovel (died 1314), married Maud Burnell, had issue.
James Lovel

Citations

References
 

Year of birth unknown
1310 deaths
13th-century English people
14th-century English people